Prince Abdulaziz Bin Mousaed Economic City (PABMEC) is a proposed planned city in Saudi Arabia. Saudi Arabia is reportedly looking to boost its involvement in industries beyond petroleum exporting.

The economic cities that have been planned will include housing and living quarters, industry jobs, and entertainment for their residents and will be built to accommodate as many as 2,000,000 people.

See also
King Abdullah Economic City
Neom

External links
 *
CNN Money

Planned cities
Populated places in Saudi Arabia
Economy of Saudi Arabia
Proposed special economic zones
Planned cities in Saudi Arabia